Roy Decker Halee (born 1934) is an American record producer and engineer, best known for working with Simon & Garfunkel, both as a group and for their solo projects.

Early life 
He grew up on Long Island, New York. His father, also named Roy Halee, provided the singing voice for Mighty Mouse in late 1940s Terrytoons cartoons, as well as the voices of Heckle and Jeckle from 1951 through 1961. His mother, Rebekah Cauble, was a former stage actress with several Broadway credits.

Career 
Halee started working as a cameraman for CBS Television in the 1950s. He was also studying to be a classical trumpet player.

He became an audio engineer for CBS Television, working on many shows and the top rated The $64,000 Question television quiz show.

As television shows moved to the West Coast, he lost his job in a union dispute and layoff at CBS Television. He went to work for Columbia Records in New York as an editor and later as a studio engineer, working with Bob Dylan, including the first long-format radio single, "Like a Rolling Stone".

After working with the Lovin' Spoonful, the Dave Clark Five and the Yardbirds, he began his partnership with Simon & Garfunkel. He has also worked with other groups such as Barbra Streisand, the Byrds, Journey (on their first album Journey), Willie Nile, Laura Nyro, Blood, Sweat & Tears, Mark-Almond Band and Blue Angel. Halee was named to the TEC Awards Hall of Fame in 2001.

Simon & Garfunkel 
Halee discovered that the uniqueness of Simon & Garfunkel's vocal harmonies could only be achieved by recording both voices on the same microphone at the same time. The song "Mrs. Robinson", from the 1968 album The Graduate, won him a Grammy Award. Three more Grammy Awards followed for his work on the album Bookends, and the song "Bridge Over Troubled Water" in 1970.

Halee is best known for producing several albums with Simon & Garfunkel. He is mentioned in their 1965 song "A Simple Desultory Philippic (or How I Was Robert McNamara'd into Submission)", written by Paul Simon. After the duo split up, he co-produced Simon's first solo album. Later, in 1985, Halee went with Simon to South Africa to record something new that, he said, "wasn't written yet, we were going with nothing, so it was a gamble. A lot of people thought we were nuts." It led to the Grammy Award-winning album Graceland. "I was having a ball recording these guys. For a guy from my background, everything was so organised generally. Here in the rawness of this, the earthiness, I was in seventh heaven." After Graceland, Roy Halee continued travelling with Simon as an engineer, to Brazil and West Africa, for the album The Rhythm of the Saints, with "all congas, bass drums, bata...everything imaginable."

Personal life  
Halee owns three German Shorthaired Pointers.  He has been married to Katherine for 53 years. Halee has three children: Roy Halee Jr., a post-production mixer for the CBS television program 60 Minutes in New York City; Walter Halee, a former book publicist and now a ski instructor at Beaver Creek in Colorado; and Laurie Halee, a mother and massage therapist who resides in Nederland, Colorado.

References

External links
2001 interview with MIX Magazine

American audio engineers
American male voice actors
Living people
Grammy Award winners
1934 births
Record producers from New York (state)
Paul Simon
Art Garfunkel
Simon & Garfunkel